Delete My Love is a 2014 Hong Kong romantic comedy film directed and written by Patrick Kong and starring Wong Cho-lam, Ivana Wong and Michael Hui.

Plot
So Po-wing or So Boring as everyone calls him doesn't have much going for him, career and personally. He has a boss from hell, toxic co-workers that steal his ideas and sabotage him, an office that doubles as the company storage room and an incompetent assistant that lets his co-workers steal his ideas just because they flirt with her. At home he has a younger sister that is a compulsive gambler and a mother that tries to trick him into selling the home his deceased grandfather left him. The only bright spot in his life is his ditsy girlfriend Bobo who always thinks she is dying and his loyal friend Wah Dee who tries to cheer him up but ends up making matters worse.

On his birthday his boss fires him for being an under-performing worker. So Boring accidentally kills his boss when trying to beg for his job. While trying to hide the body he receives a strange text on his phone that asks him "If you can delete those you don't like what would it be?", not caring he deletes the text while making the wish that he only wanted a nice boss. When he heads back to the office he finds out that his boss has changed to a super nice guy who lets his employee party and take unlimited extended paid vacation days. His "deleted to" boss is so nice that he lets So Boring run his company.

Realizing his new-found powers he soon starts deleting those that annoys him. His chubby assistant to a slim girl, dysfunctional mother and sister to a proper mother that cooks and a well behaved sister, best friend to a pirated Iron Man Tony Stark and Bobo's childhood friend who wants to marry her to a middle age men with a heavy country accent. He finally realizes he has gone too far when he accidentally deletes Bobo to a slutty blossomy mainland girl who exaggerates when she talks. Soon after, he starts to see the negative side of the "deleted to" versions of each individual when his "deleted to" boss frames him when needing to fire all the employees, mother only cooks one dish over and over again, girlfriend sexually harasses his best friend and a best friend that wants a homosexual relationship with him.

When confronting his "deleted to" boss for framing him he makes a wish for his original boss to come back, which does bring his original boss back. His original boss questions how he knows how to delete people since he had also deleted his original family years ago. As the two think on how to bring their original love ones back his boss's "deleted to" wife overhears their conversation and informs her "deleted to" son and daughter. His boss's "deleted to" family not wanting to change back decides to kill So Boring and his boss. The two escape death and brings his boss's retro style computer to be fixed so they can find out how to bring their original loved ones back, but it seems in order to bring them back they have to give up everything.

Cast
 Wong Cho-lam as So Po-wing (So Boring)
 Ivana Wong as Bobo Chung
 Michael Hui as Rich Ma
 Alex Fong as Wah Dee
 Yuen Qiu as So Fa
 Nancy Sit as "delete to" So Fa
 Jacquelin Chong as So Yee-si (So Easy)
 Lung Siu-kwan as "delete to" So Yee-si (So Easy)
 Michael Wong as "delete to" Rich Ma
 May Chan as Romantic
 Shiga Lin as "delete to" Romantic
 Eileen Tung as "delete to" Sue Ma
 Dominic Ho as "delete to" Ka-ming
 Samantha Ko as "delete to" Rose
 Maria Cordero as Sue Ma
 Eric Kwok as "delete to" Wah Dee
 Daniella Wang as "delete to" Bobo Chung
 Mimi Chu as Bobo's mother
 Lo Hoi-pang as Bobo's father
 Benz Hui as Wan Siu-lun
 Babyjohn Choi as Wan Duk-fuk
 Bat Leung-gum as "delete to" Wan Duk-fuk
 Bowie Wu as Sun Tong-sau
 Annie Liu as Chu Lei-sin
 Philip Keung as Hak gor
 Bob Lam as photographer
 Julian Cheung as Captain Cool ("delete to" Rich Ma)
 Mak Ling-Ling as "delete to" Rich Ma's fiancée

Trivia
 Alex Fong's character Wah Dee is a parody of Hong Kong actor singer Andy Lau's past movie characters. Notable characters are from such films as A Moment of Romance and Runaway Blues. Instrumental versions of Lau's songs "Secretly Cheating 獨自去偷歡" and "Live a Dashing Life 一起走過的日子" are played in the background during Wah Dee's appearances.
 The background music played during Nancy Sit's montage is the opening theme song from TVB's long-running soap opera A Kindred Spirit, which Sit also happens to star in as the motherly Leung Yun Ho.
 Eric Kwok's appearance is modeled after Robert Downey, Jr.'s Iron Man Tony Stark character.
 Wong Cho-lam, Ivana Wong, Mimi Chu, Bowie Wu, May Chan and Bob Lam starred in TVB's 2013 comedy drama Inbound Troubles, for which Wong Cho-lam also served as a writer.
 Julian Cheung's cameo role as Captain Cool aka "delete to" Rich Ma no. 2 is in reference to his role as Jayden Koo in TVB's 2013 drama Triumph in the Skies II.
 The film constantly takes jabs at ATV, the main rival television station of TVB. A majority of the actors in the film are contracted TVB artistes.

Reception
The film has grossed ¥12.3 million (US$1,980,000) in China. The film grossed HK$1.23 million (US$158,000) on the opening weekend in Hong Kong.

References

External links
 

2014 romantic comedy films
Films directed by Patrick Kong
Hong Kong romantic comedy films
2010s Hong Kong films